Robert Sherwood Dillon (born January 7, 1929) was the United States Ambassador to Lebanon from 1981 to 1983. He was born in 1929 in Chicago and attended Duke University, graduating in 1951.

Dillon served in the US army for eighteen months before being discharged and continuing his education at Duke University. After receiving his B.A. in English Literature in 1951, he served as a CIA intelligence officer with Chinese Nationalist irregular forces. Following his time in the CIA, he joined the Foreign Service. Dillon spent more than 30 years in the Foreign Service with assignments including Venezuela, Turkey, Malaysia, Egypt, Lebanon. He served as Deputy Chief of Mission in Malaysia, Turkey and Egypt and oversaw the negotiations and security of hostages during The Kuala Lumpur Hostage Crisis. Dillon served as US Ambassador to Lebanon for two years, surviving the 1983 United States embassy bombing, before retiring from the foreign service in 1983 with the rank of Career Minister.

After his time in the Foreign Service, Dillon joined the United Nations as Assistant Secretary General and later served for five years as Deputy Commissioner General of the United Nations Relief and Works Agency for Palestine Refugees in the Near East. In 1988, Dillon became President and CEO of the non-profit, America-Mideast Education and Training Services, Inc., which he left in 1995. From 1994-1995, Dillon worked for the UN as Special Humanitarian Envoy for Rwanda and Burundi. After which he worked as for six months with the Department of State. Dillon Currently resides in Arlington Virginia and has authored a memoir and biography of his father, Dale Crowell Dillon.

Books
One of the Very Best Men by Robert Sherwood Dillon (Five and Ten Press, March 2004)  (Memoir)
An American Soldier in World War I by Robert Sherwood Dillon (Five and Ten Press, June 2005)  (Biography of Dale Crowell Dillon)

References 

1929 births
Living people
Ambassadors of the United States to Lebanon
Duke University Trinity College of Arts and Sciences alumni
United States Foreign Service personnel
20th-century American diplomats